Jimmy DeWayne DuBose (born October 25, 1954) is an American former college and professional football player who was a running back in the National Football League (NFL) for three seasons during the 1970s.  DuBose played college football for the University of Florida, and thereafter, he played professionally for the Tampa Bay Buccaneers of the NFL.

Early life 

DuBose was born in Enterprise, Alabama in 1954.  He attended Sarasota High School in Sarasota, Florida, and he was a standout high school football player for the Sarasota Sailors, rushing for 1,400 yards and sixteen touchdowns as a senior.

College career 

DuBose accepted an athletic scholarship to attend the University of Florida in Gainesville, Florida, where he played fullback for coach Doug Dickey's Florida Gators football team from 1972 to 1975.  Dickey described him as a "picture perfect fullback," able to run over people like a fullback but also able to run like a halfback in the open field.  Memorably, DuBose ran for 180 yards against the Vanderbilt Commodores, including an eighty-yard touchdown run on the first play from scrimmage, and rushed for 204 yards versus the Florida State Seminoles as a senior.  Averaging nearly seven yards per carry, he led the Gators to a 9–2 record, the first time the Gators had achieved nine regular-season wins.

DuBose's 2,159 career rushing yards are, as of 2009, the tenth-best in Gators team history; his senior-year effort of 1,307 yards remains the Gators' third-best season total (following two of Emmitt Smith's seasons).  As a senior team captain in 1975, he rushed for 1,402 yards and six touchdowns on 209 carries, and was recognized as a first-team All-Southeastern Conference (SEC) selection, the SEC Player of the Year, and a second-team All-American; he also finished sixth in the Heisman Trophy balloting.  DuBose was the recipient of the Gators' Fergie Ferguson Award recognizing the "senior football player who displayed outstanding leadership, character and courage."  He graduated from Florida with a bachelor's degree in public relations in 1980, and was inducted into the University of Florida Athletic Hall of Fame as a "Gator Great" in 1987.

Professional career 

DuBose was selected by the expansion Tampa Bay Buccaneers in the second round (thirtieth pick overall) of the 1976 NFL Draft, following the Buccaneers' first-round pick, Leroy Selmon, and became part of the inaugural Buccaneers line-up. Playing with a year's experience behind an improved line, he was the Bucs' most consistent runner in the  preseason, earning the praise of Buccaneers offensive coordinator Joe Gibbs. In , he became the Buccaneers' first-ever running back to gain 100 yards in a game. Unfortunately, only four plays after achieving this milestone, he tore knee ligaments while tackling New York Giants linebacker Harry Carson after an interception, an injury that benched him for the entire  season. Miami coach Don Shula cut DuBose from the squad, feeling that he would, at 205 pounds, be too small to replace Larry Csonka.

In his three-season NFL career, DuBose appeared in thirty-three games, started fifteen of them, and rushed for 704 yards and four touchdowns on 184 attempts.  He also compiled seventeen receptions for 118 yards.

Life after football 

DuBose is married, and he and his wife have a son and a daughter.  DuBose and his wife worked in education. DuBose retired in 2018.

See also 

 Florida Gators football, 1970–79
 History of the Tampa Bay Buccaneers
 List of Florida Gators football All-Americans
 List of Florida Gators in the NFL Draft
 List of SEC Most Valuable Players
 List of University of Florida alumni
 University of Florida Athletic Hall of Fame

References

Bibliography 

 Carlson, Norm, University of Florida Football Vault: The History of the Florida Gators, Whitman Publishing, LLC, Atlanta, Georgia (2007).  .
 Golenbock, Peter, Go Gators!  An Oral History of Florida's Pursuit of Gridiron Glory, Legends Publishing, LLC, St. Petersburg, Florida (2002).  .
 Hairston, Jack, Tales from the Gator Swamp: A Collection of the Greatest Gator Stories Ever Told, Sports Publishing, LLC, Champaign, Illinois (2002).  .
 McCarthy, Kevin M.,  Fightin' Gators: A History of University of Florida Football, Arcadia Publishing, Mount Pleasant, South Carolina (2000).  .
 McEwen, Tom, The Gators: A Story of Florida Football, The Strode Publishers, Huntsville, Alabama (1974).  .
 Nash, Noel, ed., The Gainesville Sun Presents The Greatest Moments in Florida Gators Football, Sports Publishing, Inc., Champaign, Illinois (1998).  .

1954 births
Living people
People from Enterprise, Alabama
Sportspeople from Sarasota, Florida
Players of American football from Florida
American football running backs
Florida Gators football players
Tampa Bay Buccaneers players